Vivian Prescott was an Italian born American actress.

Biography 
Prescott appeared in 202 films between 1909 and 1917. She was born in Genoa, Italy and spent some time on the American stage before entering silent pictures.

Filmography
Winning Back His Love (1910)
Comrades (1911 short)
Fisher Folks (1911)
The Primal Call (1911 short) - The Millionaire's Girlfriend
The Man from the West (1912) - Mary, the cook
The Sands of Dee (1912)
Man's Enemy (1914)

References

External links

Year of birth missing
Year of death missing
American silent film actresses
20th-century American actresses